"Wish You Were Here, Buddy" is a song written and originally recorded by Pat Boone. Released as a single, it peaked at number 49 on the US Billboard Hot 100.

Track listing 
7" single (1966)
 "Wish You Were Here, Buddy" (1:58)
 "Love for Love" (2:35)

Charts

References 

Pat Boone songs
1966 songs
1966 singles
Dot Records singles
Song recordings produced by Nick Venet
Song recordings produced by Randy Wood (record producer)